The Dartmouth Law Journal, formerly the Dartmouth College Undergraduate Journal of Law, is a student-run legal journal founded in 2003. The print journal accepts articles from lawyers, law students, judges and legal academics, and is one of the nation's first law journals run entirely by undergraduates. It is edited and published by the students of Dartmouth College in Hanover, New Hampshire. The Journal also publishes work by undergraduates on their online platform, DLJ Online.

References

Publisher's Description

American law journals
Dartmouth College
General law journals
Law journals edited by students
Publications established in 2003